Li Zhendong (Chinese: 李震东; Pinyin: Lǐ Zhèndōng; born 14 March 1990) is a Chinese football player who currently plays for China League Two side Qingdao Zhongchuang Hengtai.

Club career
Zhu started his professional career with Beijing Baxy in 2009. He was signed by China League One side Dalian Yifang in 2016.

Career statistics
Statistics accurate as of match played 31 December 2020.

References

External links

1990 births
Living people
Chinese footballers
Footballers from Dalian
Association football midfielders
Dalian Professional F.C. players
China League One players